Haiyang may refer to:

Places in China
Haiyang, a county-level city in Shandong
Chao'an District, Chaozhou, Guangdong, formerly known as Haiyang

Towns
Haiyang, Anhui (海阳), in Xiuning County, Anhui
Haiyang, Hebei (海阳), in Qinhuangdao, Hebei

Townships
Haiyang Township, Chongqing (海洋乡), in Xiushan Tujia and Miao Autonomous County, Chongqing
Haiyang Township, Guangxi (海洋乡), in Lingchuan County, Guangxi

Other uses
Haiyang (satellite) or Haiyang, Chinese remote sensing satellites